Giovanni Crivelli may refer to:

Giovanni Crivelli (painter) (il Crivellino), 18th-century painter
Giovanni Francesco Crivelli (1691–1743), Venetian mathematician and priest
Giovanni Battista Crivelli (died 1652), Italian composer